Keith Webb (31 March 1933 – 19 August 2021) was an Australian rules footballer who played with Fitzroy in the Victorian Football League (VFL).

Notes

External links 		
		
		
		
		
		
		
1933 births
2021 deaths
Australian rules footballers from Victoria (Australia)		
Fitzroy Football Club players